Angels in America is a 2003 American HBO miniseries directed by Mike Nichols and based on the Pulitzer Prize–winning 1991 play of the same name by Tony Kushner. Set in 1985, the film revolves around six New Yorkers whose lives intersect. At its core, it is the fantastical story of Prior Walter, a gay man living with AIDS who is visited by an angel. The film explores a wide variety of themes, including Reagan era politics, the spreading AIDS epidemic, and a rapidly changing social and political climate.

HBO broadcast the film in various formats: two three-hour chunks that correspond to Millennium Approaches and Perestroika, further divided into six one-hour "chapters" that roughly correspond to an act or two of each of these plays; the first three chapters ("Bad News", "In Vitro", and "The Messenger") were initially broadcast on December 7, 2003, to international acclaim, with the final three chapters ("Stop Moving!", "Beyond Nelly", and "Heaven, I'm in Heaven") following.

Angels in America was the most-watched made-for-cable film in 2003, and earned much critical acclaim and numerous accolades: at the 56th Primetime Emmy Awards, it became the first of only three programs in Emmy history (along with Schitt's Creek in 2020, and The Crown in 2021) to sweep every major eligible category, and won all four acting categories. It also won in all five eligible categories at the 61st Golden Globe Awards. In 2006, The Seattle Times listed the series among "Best of the filmed AIDS portrayals" on the occasion of the 25th anniversary of AIDS.

Plot

Millennium Approaches
It is 1985, Ronald Reagan is in the White House, and AIDS is causing mass death in the Americas. In Manhattan, Prior Walter tells Louis, his lover of four years, that he has AIDS; Louis, unable to handle it, leaves him. As disease and loneliness ravage Prior, guilt invades Louis. Joe Pitt, a Mormon and Republican attorney, is pushed by right-wing fixer Roy Cohn toward a job at the US Department of Justice. Both Pitt and Cohn are in the closet: Pitt out of shame and religious turmoil, Cohn to preserve his power and image. Pitt's wife Harper is strung out on Valium, causing her to hallucinate constantly (sometimes jointly with Prior during his fever dreams) and she longs to escape from her sexless marriage. An angel with ulterior motives commands Prior to become a prophet.

Perestroika
Prior is helped in his decision by Joe's mother, Hannah, and Belize, a close friend and drag queen. Joe leaves his wife and goes to live with Louis, but the relationship does not work out because of ideological differences. Roy is diagnosed with AIDS early on and, as his life comes to a close, he is haunted by the ghost of Ethel Rosenberg. As the film continues, the lost souls come together to create bonds of love, loss, and loneliness and, in the end, discover forgiveness and overcome abandonment.

Cast
 Al Pacino as Roy Cohn
 Meryl Streep as Hannah Pitt / Ethel Rosenberg / Rabbi Isidor Chemelwitz / The Angel Australia
 Patrick Wilson as Joe Pitt
 Mary-Louise Parker as Harper Pitt
 Emma Thompson as Nurse Emily / Homeless woman / The Angel America
 Justin Kirk as Prior Walter / Leatherman in park
 Jeffrey Wright as Mr. Lies / Norman "Belize" Arriaga / Homeless man / The Angel Europa
 Ben Shenkman as Louis Ironson / The Angel Oceania
 Brian Markinson as Martin Heller
 James Cromwell as Henry, Roy's doctor
 Michael Gambon as Prior Walter Ancestor No. 1
 Simon Callow as Prior Walter Ancestor No. 2
 Robin Weigert as Mormon Mother

Soundtrack

The soundtrack of the series by Thomas Newman was nominated for the Grammy Award for Best Score Soundtrack Album for a Motion Picture, Television or Other Visual Media.

Production

Cary Brokaw, executive producer of the series, worked for over ten years to bring the 1991 stage production to television, having first read it in 1989, before its first production. In 1993, Al Pacino committed to playing the role of Roy Cohn. In the meantime, a number of directors, including Robert Altman, were part of the project. Altman worked on the project in 1993 and 1994, before budget constraints forced him to move out, as few studios could risk producing two successive 150-minute movies at the cost of $40 million. Subsequently, Kushner tried squeezing the play into a feature film, at which he eventually failed, realizing there was "literally too much plot," and settling for the TV miniseries format. While Kushner continued adapting the play until the late 1990s, HBO Films stepped in as producer, allocating a budget of $60 million.

Brokaw gave Mike Nichols the script while he was working with him on Wit (2001) starring Emma Thompson, who also co-adapted the play of the same title. The principal cast, including Meryl Streep, Pacino, and Thompson, having recently worked with Nichols, was immediately assembled by him. Though Ben Shenkman had previously portrayed Louis in the San Francisco A.C.T.'s production (as well as portraying Roy Cohn in the NYU graduate acting program's workshop of Perestroika prior to its Broadway opening), Jeffrey Wright was the only original cast member to appear in the Broadway version, having won the 1994 Tony Award for Best Performance by a Featured Actor for his stage performance. The shooting started in May 2002, and after a 137-day schedule, ended in January 2003. Filming was done primarily at Kaufman Astoria Studios, New York City, with several pivotal scenes being shot on the streets of the city and at Bethesda Fountain in Central Park. The Heaven sequence was shot at Hadrian's Villa, the Roman archaeological complex at Tivoli, Italy, dating early 2nd century.

Special effects in the series were by Richard Edlund (Star Wars trilogy), who created the two important Angel visitation sequences, as well as the opening sequence wherein the angel at the Bethesda Fountain opens its eyes in the end, signifying her "coming to life". Costumer Martin Izquierdo was hired to design functioning wings for Thompson's Angel.

Reception
Review aggregator Rotten Tomatoes gave the series a 92% "Certified Fresh" rating based on 24 reviews, with an average rating of 9.5/10. The critical consensus reads "In Angels of America, writer Tony Kushner and director Mike Nichols imaginatively and artistically deliver heavy, vital subject matter, colorfully imparted by a stellar cast." The New York Times wrote that "Mike Nichols's television version is a work of art in itself." According to a Boston Globe review, "director Mike Nichols, and a magnificent cast led by Meryl Streep have pulled a spellbinding and revelatory TV movie out of the Tony- and Pulitzer Prize-winning work" and that he "managed to make "Angels in America" thrive onscreen..."

Awards and nominations
In 2004, Angels in America broke the record previously held by Roots for the most Emmys awarded to a miniseries in a single year by winning 11 awards from 21 nominations. Angels in America became the first of only three programs (following by Schitt's Creek in comedy at the 72nd Emmy Awards and The Crown in drama at the 73rd Emmy Awards) to sweep every major category in Emmy history. It also joined Caesar's Hour, in 1957, as the only series to win all four main acting categories in one night.

Along with television miniseries Eleanor and Franklin, the series became one of the two most-honored programs in television history. The record was broken four years later by John Adams at the 60th Primetime Emmy Awards, which won 13 trophies from 23 nominations.

References

Further reading
 Love In the Time Of Reagan. CinemaQueer.
 
 Winged Victory. New York Magazine television review.
 
 How HBO, Mike Nichols and Tony Kushner Brought Angels in America to the Screen. Paste Magazine.
 TV: Gay characters, themes found more acceptance and popularity in 2003. Pittsburgh Post-Gazette.
 The Lector Effect. Slate Magazine review arguing that the miniseries "gets Kushner wrong".
 Angels in America. Variety review.
 Angels in a Changed America. The Village Voice.
 Geis, Deborah R.; Kruger, Steven F. (eds.) (1997). Approaching the Millennium: Essays on Angels in America. Ann Arbor: University of Michigan Press.

External links

 
 
 
 
 Angels in America: A Gay Fantasia on National Themes at TV Guide

2000s American television miniseries
2000s American political television series
2000s American LGBT-related drama television series
2003 American television series debuts
2003 American television series endings
American fantasy television series
American political drama television series
Angels in television
Best Miniseries or Television Movie Golden Globe winners
Cultural depictions of Julius and Ethel Rosenberg
English-language television shows
Films directed by Mike Nichols
Films with screenplays by Tony Kushner
Gay-related television shows
GLAAD Media Award-winning shows
HBO original programming
HIV/AIDS in television
Mormonism in fiction
Primetime Emmy Award for Outstanding Miniseries winners
Primetime Emmy Award-winning television series
Television shows based on plays
Television series set in 1985
Reagan Era